Willem Petrus Odendaal Prinsloo (25 February 1954 – 27 June 2018) was a South African tennis player.

Tennis career
During his career, Prinsloo participated at the French Open, Wimbledon and the US Open. His best singles performance at a Grand Slam was reaching the second round at the 1977 and 1978 US Open.

On the Grand Prix circuit he reached the quarter-finals at the 1976 South African Open before losing to the eventual champion, Harold Solomon. On the Challenger Tour he reached the final at the Raleigh Challenger, losing to Mike Cahill. He achieved career-high world rankings of No.81 in singles during July 1977.

References

External links
 
 

1954 births
2018 deaths
South African male tennis players
White South African people